Ronny Listner (born 20 July 1979 in Karl-Marx-Stadt, Saxony, East Germany) is a German bobsledder who has competed since 2000. He won the bronze medal in the four-man event at the 2008 FIBT World Championships in Altenberg, Germany.

At the 2010 Winter Olympics in Vancouver, Listner finished fourth in the four-man event.

References

1979 births
Living people
German male bobsledders
Sportspeople from Chemnitz
Bobsledders at the 2010 Winter Olympics
Olympic bobsledders of Germany